Shota Saito may refer to:

, Japanese footballer
, Japanese footballer
  (斉藤 祥太), Japanese actor